Tania Glyde is a British psychotherapist and writer. They trained in integrative psychotherapy at the Minster Centre, London, qualifying in 2013. Their work is trauma-informed and pluralistic, and they work mainly with Gender, Sex and Relationship Diverse (GSRD; previously known as GSD) clients.

For a Masters in Psychotherapy and Counselling from the University of East London (2019) Glyde researched the experiences of LGBTQ+ and menopausal people, both in therapy and in the wider healthcare system in the UK. The resulting work, 'How can therapists best support their queer menopausal clients?’ is published in the Taylor & Francis journal Sexual & Relationship Therapy. They continue to promote awareness around LGBTQ+ approaches to menopause through social media, writing, and activism.

They founded, with several colleagues, the London Gender, Sex and Relationship Diversity Practice in 2014, which consists of a group of therapists focusing on GSRD sex & relationships.

They have a strong interest in sexology and trained as a somatic sex educator. They were Time Out magazine's sex columnist from 2002 to 2004.

Their journalism has been published in the Lancet and Lancet Psychiatry, notably 'Wanting to be normal', 'BDSM – Psychotherapy's grey area', and Chemsex Exposed'.

They have been quoted in the media on the subject of LGBTQ+ approaches to menopause, in Diva magazine and Good Housekeeping.

They attended Oakham School in Rutland, before studying at Magdalen College, Oxford.

Bibliography
Cleaning Up – How I Gave Up Drinking and Lived (2008)ISBN 1852429496
Junk DNA (2000)ISBN 1899598197
Clever Girl (1995)ISBN 0330342592

References

External links
 London Central Counselling, Tania Glyde's private practice.
 The London GSRD Practice.
 Queermenopause.com, Tania Glyde's research website.

Living people
British short story writers
British journalists
20th-century British short story writers
Year of birth missing (living people)